The 2011 Edmonton Indy was the fourth running of the Edmonton Indy and the tenth round of the 2011 IndyCar Series season. It took place on Sunday, July 24, 2011. The race contested over 80 laps at the  Edmonton City Centre Airport in Edmonton, Alberta. The circuit was modified to facilitate overtaking.

Grid

Race

Standings after the race 
Drivers' Championship standings

References 

2011
Edmonton Indy
Edmonton Indy
2011 in Canadian motorsport
July 2011 sports events in Canada